Red Fox Farm is a historic home and tobacco farm located near Skipwith, Mecklenburg County, Virginia. The house dates to the late-19th century, and is a one-story, two-room-plan frame structure with gable roof.  Also on the property are the contributing five log tobacco barns, a frame pack house, a log strip house, a log cabin, a smokehouse, a corn crib, and a commissary.

It was listed on the National Register of Historic Places in 1993.

References

Houses on the National Register of Historic Places in Virginia
Farms on the National Register of Historic Places in Virginia
Houses in Mecklenburg County, Virginia
National Register of Historic Places in Mecklenburg County, Virginia